George B. Skogmo (1880-1968) was a member of the Wisconsin State Senate.

Biography
Skogmo was born in Whalan, Minnesota in August 1880, sources have differed on the exact date. In 1902, he graduated from River Falls High School in River Falls, Wisconsin. He died in August 1968.

Career
Skogmo was elected to the Senate from the 10th District in 1912, 1916 and 1920. Additionally, he was City Treasurer of River Falls from 1910 to 1912. He was a Republican.

References

People from Fillmore County, Minnesota
People from River Falls, Wisconsin
Republican Party Wisconsin state senators
City and town treasurers in the United States
1880 births
1968 deaths
Burials in Wisconsin
20th-century American politicians